María Concepción César (born María Concepción Cesarano; 25 October 1926 – 26 July 2018) was an Argentine actress, singer and dancer. Her first film was Pampa Bárbara with her uncle, actor Francisco Petrone.

She also achieved fame in television musical shows and soap operas. During the 1960s, she played Maggie in a theatrical version of After the Fall by Arthur Miller.

Filmography

External links 
 
 

1926 births
2018 deaths
Actresses from Buenos Aires
Argentine film actresses
Argentine radio actresses
Argentine television personalities
Women television personalities
20th-century Argentine actresses
21st-century Argentine actresses